Crepis biennis is a European species of flowering plant in the family Asteraceae with the common name rough hawksbeard. It is native to Europe and Asia Minor, as well as being sparingly naturalized in scattered locations in the northeastern United States and on the island of Newfoundland in eastern Canada. Many people think that they are dandelions because they look so alike but that is only because both are in the daisy family.

Crepis biennis  is a perennial herb up to 120 cm (48 inches) tall. One plant can produce as many as 14 small flower heads, each with up to 100 yellow ray florets but no disc florets.

References

External links
Go Botany, New England Wildflower Society: Crepis biennis
Flora of Northern Ireland — with photos.
—Plantarium, Crepis biennis L. Описание таксона, Русскоязычные названия —  with photos.
Ultraviolet Flowers of Bjørn Rørslett — photos with visible light and with ultraviolet light.
Tropicos.org: photo of herbarium specimen at Missouri Botanical Garden

biennis
Flora of Europe
Flora of Western Asia
Flora of the Northeastern United States
Flora of Newfoundland
Plants described in 1753
Taxa named by Carl Linnaeus
Flora without expected TNC conservation status